Obery Mack Hendricks Jr. (born 1953) is a visiting research scholar at Columbia University. Before taking this position he was a professor at Drew University and a visiting professor at Princeton Theological Seminary.  He has also served as president of Payne Theological Seminary, the oldest African-American theological institution.  He is an ordained elder in the African Methodist Episcopal Church.

A former Wall Street investment executive, Hendricks received his PhD from Princeton University. He is currently a spokesperson who has been featured on C-SPAN, PBS, NPR, the Bloomberg network, hip hop stations and more. He has been a featured writer as well as an editor or editorial advisor for multiple publications including the award-winning Tikkun magazine. He is a member of the Faith Advisory Council of the Democratic National Committee and an Affiliated Scholar in the "Faith and Public Policy Initiative" at the Center for American Progress.

Hendricks currently lives in New York City.

Books
Living Water, HarperOne, 2003. 
The Politics of Jesus: Rediscovering the True Revolutionary Nature of Jesus' Teachings and How They Have Been Corrupted, Doubleday, 2006.   
The Universe Bends Toward Justice: Radical Reflections on the Bible, the Church, and the Body Politic, Orbis Books, 2011.  
Christians Against Christianity: How Right-Wing Evangelicals are Destroying Our Nation and Our Faith, Beacon Press, 2021.

References

External links
 

1953 births
20th-century American male writers
20th-century American theologians
20th-century Methodist ministers
21st-century American male writers
21st-century American theologians
21st-century Methodist ministers
Academics from New York (state)
African Americans in New York City
African Methodist Episcopal Church clergy
African-American theologians
American Christian socialists
American Christian theologians
American male non-fiction writers
Christian radicals
Christian socialist theologians
Christians from New York (state)
Clergy from New York City
Drew University faculty
Living people
Methodist socialists
Methodist theologians
New York (state) Democrats
Princeton Theological Seminary alumni
Princeton University alumni
Rutgers University alumni
Writers from New York City